Gazapati (1497–1515) was king of Arakan from 1513 to 1515. The eldest son of King Raza by a concubine was placed on the throne by the ministers after he had successfully put down a rebellion, which his father had been unable to take on. However, the young king quickly proved to be a tyrant. He had his father killed soon after his accession, and mistreated everyone at the court. With his confidants running amok, the kingdom is said to have suffered a great economic crisis due to their mismanagement. The young king is also said to be a womanizer, sleeping with wives of generals whom he had sent to the front at the Bengal border. The ministers had him beheaded in January 1515, and placed Saw O, a granduncle of his, on the throne.

References

Bibliography
 

Monarchs of Mrauk-U
1497 births
1515 deaths
16th century in the Mrauk-U Kingdom
16th-century Burmese monarchs